California's 46th district may refer to:

 California's 46th congressional district
 California's 46th State Assembly district